Robert Thomson (born 28 May 1993) is a Scottish footballer who plays as a forward for Scottish League Two club Stirling Albion. He has previously played for Dundee United, Alloa Athletic, Dunfermline Athletic, Brechin City, Dumbarton, Greenock Morton and Stenhousemuir.

Career

Dundee United
Born in Paisley, Thomson spent the majority of his youth career as an academy player with Scottish Premier League side Dundee United. After spending time on loan at Alloa in 2012–13, Thomson returned to Dundee United and made his official first-team debut in the Scottish Premier League on 9 March 2013, against St Mirren coming on as a substitute in the 68th minute for Rory Boulding as Dundee United drew the match 0–0.

Alloa Athletic loan
On 11 August 2012, it was officially confirmed that Thomson had signed with Scottish Second Division side Alloa Athletic on loan till 1 January 2013. Thomson then made his debut for Alloa Athletic that same day, in a 1–1 draw against East Fife as a substitute for Mark Docherty. In the following game, on 18 August 2012, he scored the first professional goals of his career, with a brace against Albion Rovers in the 79th and 83rd minutes of the match to give Alloa Athletic a 3–0 away victory. Thomson then scored two further goals for Alloa, on 1 September 2012 in a 3–1 win against Brechin City and then on 15 December 2012, against Stranraer in a 3–2 defeat.

Dunfermline Athletic
On 30 August 2013, Thomson signed for Dunfermline Athletic on a contract running until the end of December 2013. He made his debut the following day in a 3–1 win against Stranraer. On 14 September 2013, he scored what turned out to be his only goal for Dunfermline in a 1–1 draw against Brechin City.

Brechin City
On 27 January 2014, Thomson signed for Brechin City until the end of the season. He scored 15 goals in the 2015–16 season and won the Scottish League One Player of the Month for April a month in which he scored his first senior hat-trick in a 5–1 victory over Peterhead.

Dumbarton
In May 2016, Thomson signed for Scottish Championship club Dumbarton. He scored his first goal for the club in a 3–3 draw with Peterhead in July 2016. He scored the Sons 500th goal at the Cheaper Insurance Direct Stadium in March 2017, with the first of a double against Raith Rovers in a 4–0 victory.

Greenock Morton
After impressing Greenock Morton manager Jim Duffy with displays against his side, Thomson signed a pre-contract agreement for a two-year deal with the Cappielow club on 9 February 2017, with the move taking place during the summer of 2017.

Alloa Athletic
On 18 June 2019, Thomson rejoined Alloa Athletic on a permanent basis.

Stenhousemuir
In May 2021, Thomson signed for League Two club Stenhousemuir.

Stirling Albion 
In May 2022, Thomson signed for Scottish League Two side Stirling Albion.

Career statistics

References

External links

1993 births
Alloa Athletic F.C. players
Association football forwards
Brechin City F.C. players
Dumbarton F.C. players
Dundee United F.C. players
Dunfermline Athletic F.C. players
Greenock Morton F.C. players
Living people
Scottish Football League players
Scottish footballers
Scottish Premier League players
Scottish Professional Football League players
Stenhousemuir F.C. players
Stirling Albion F.C. players